Marko Mirić (Serbian Cyrillic: Марко Мирић; born 26 March 1987) is a Serbian professional footballer who plays for Mladost Lučani.

Honours
Red Star Belgrade
Serbian Cup: 2011–12

References

External links
Marko Mirić at Sofascore

Marko Mirić profile at Utakmica.rs

1987 births
Living people
Sportspeople from Kragujevac
Serbian footballers
Serbia international footballers
Association football forwards
Serbian expatriate footballers
Expatriate footballers in Belarus
Expatriate footballers in Croatia
Expatriate footballers in Belgium
Expatriate footballers in Bosnia and Herzegovina
Serbian SuperLiga players
Belarusian Premier League players
Belgian Pro League players
Premier League of Bosnia and Herzegovina players
FK Metalac Gornji Milanovac players
FK Spartak Subotica players
Red Star Belgrade footballers
FK Radnički 1923 players
FC Minsk players
NK Slaven Belupo players
K.S.C. Lokeren Oost-Vlaanderen players
FK Borac Banja Luka players
FK Mladost Lučani players